Westinghouse Rail Systems Ltd (formerly Westinghouse Signals Ltd) was a British supplier of railway signalling and control equipment to the rail industry worldwide.  Its head office was in Chippenham, Wiltshire, where it manufactured a variety of mechanical and electrical/electronic railway signalling equipment.  It had six other UK offices in Croydon, York, Birmingham, Crawley, Swanley and Glasgow.  It also had a number of overseas offices, particularly in the Far East, including Melbourne.

Westinghouse was the largest signalling design and control engineering company within the UK. Its largest contract was awarded in 2004: a ten-year £850m re-signalling of eight London Underground lines for the Metronet Public-Private Partnership.

The company was owned by Invensys plc before being sold to Siemens in 2013. It is now part of Siemens Mobility, the Westinghouse name having been dropped.

History

Westinghouse Rail Systems' origin is in the signals division of Westinghouse Brake and Signal Company, which was founded as Westinghouse Brake & Saxby Signal Company in 1920. Hawker Siddeley purchased that company in 1979 and sold it to BTR plc in 1992. In 1999, BTR merged with Siebe to form Invensys.

Invensys split the business into two companies, Westinghouse Signals and Westinghouse Brakes, then sold Westinghouse Brakes to Knorr-Bremse in April 2000. Westinghouse Signals (invensys) is now part of Siemens Mobility.

Products 
Westinghouse produces a variety of signalling and railway control equipment, including:
 Style 63 point machine
 Solid State Interlocking
 Westlock Interlocking
 WESTRACE
 WESTEX
 WESTCAD

References

External links 
Siemens Mobility website
Westinghouse Rail Systems website, archived in May 2007

Engineering companies of the United Kingdom
Railway signalling manufacturers